In the English county of West Sussex, many former chapels, churches and other places of worship have been demolished without direct replacement. Declining congregations, structural problems, commercial redevelopment, vandalism and many other reasons have contributed to the loss of about 70 buildings across the county. Major towns such as Bognor Regis, Littlehampton, Worthing and the cathedral city of Chichester have each lost several religious buildings, while former chapels have also been removed in rural hamlets such as Copsale, Iping Marsh and South Mundham.

Details of all places of public worship which have been completely demolished without direct replacement on the same site are recorded here. Private, hospital, school, prison and similar chapels are excluded, as are former churches which are ruinous but still extant—such as the derelict building in Bedham which functioned as the hamlet's church and school. Buildings demolished to allow a new church to be constructed on the same site are also excluded; but if a church was pulled down and a replacement was built on a different site, as at Chichester (St Richard's Church) and Burgess Hill (the Baptist church), details of the old building are given.

Many churches listed here were built during the 19th century and demolished after World War II. Although the government's scheme of statutory listing for buildings of special architectural and historic interest had started in the 1940s, it was—with a few exceptions—not until the late 20th century that churches and chapels of the Victorian era began to be given the protection from demolition or significant alteration which listed status confers. By 1980, nearly 80 of the approximately 600 Victorian places of worship across Sussex as a whole had been lost. Many demolition-threatened buildings survived by "pure chance, combined with the laudable initiative of a few private individuals": processes to preserve former churches that were no longer required, coordinated at a denominational or local level, never developed. Fewer places of worship have been lost since about 1980, as charitable bodies such as the Churches Conservation Trust, Friends of Friendless Churches and Historic Chapels Trust have become more influential and local initiatives have had more success. Nevertheless, some churches of considerable architectural merit have been lost, such as the "most distinguished modern church in Crawley" (the European-influenced St Richard's Church at Three Bridges), St John the Baptist's Church in Bognor Regis ("one of the town's few distinctive buildings") and the substantial St Peter's Church at Treyford, often called the Cathedral of the Downs.

Demolished places of worship

All Saints Church, Baldwins Hill
Between 1887 and the 1960s, a church dedicated to All Saints stood at a location which is now within West Sussex but which was part of neighbouring Surrey at the time. Sidney Poole Lowell of Baldwins, a large house north of East Grinstead, paid for the church to be built near his house because of the distance from St Swithun's parish church. St Mary the Virgin's church was later built nearby, but the older building—originally dedicated to St Matthias—still stood. Because it was just over the county border in Surrey, it was part of the Anglican Diocese of Southwark and was not linked to the new church. This situation was changed in 1952, when the renamed All Saints Church was transferred to the Diocese of Chichester and became a second church within St Mary the Virgin's parish. Nine years later, it was closed because of structural defects; the church committee concluded it "no longer serv[ed] any useful purpose".

Gallery

See also
List of demolished places of worship in Brighton and Hove
List of demolished places of worship in East Sussex

Notes

References

Bibliography

Lists of churches in West Sussex
West Sus